Philip Hipkins Clarke (born 23 January 1942) is a former New Zealand rugby union player. He played four matches for the All Blacks on that tour, but did not appear in any of the internationals.

Clarke later coached the Opawa club in Blenheim, and his son, Ben, played representative rugby for Marlborough.

References

1942 births
Living people
People educated at Henderson High School, Auckland
Rugby union players from Auckland
New Zealand rugby union players
New Zealand international rugby union players
Canterbury rugby union players
Marlborough rugby union players
Rugby union wings
New Zealand rugby union coaches